Discovery Channel (often referred to as simply Discovery) was a television channel which broadcasts to Russia and all of the CIS countries. Broadcasts in Russia were closed on March 9, 2022.

According to viewing research, Discovery had the second largest reach of all non-terrestrial television channels in the beginning of 2009; only the news channel RBC TV was more popular.

In late 2007, Discovery switched to the ABS 1 satellite, meaning it would extend its reach eastwards and be accessible in all of Russia, as well as several countries in Central Asia. Advertising sales started soon thereafter, on December 1, 2007. Discovery's ad sales in Russia were handled by a company called Video International.

Until 2006, Discovery was represented in Russia and the CIS countries by Zone Vision. This partnership ended when Discovery changed their representative to Media Broadcasting Group Limited. MBG became responsible for the distribution of all seven Discovery channels in Russia, while Discovery contemplated opening an office of their own in Moscow.

Discovery halted all broadcasts of its 15 linear channels to Russia through the Media Alliance partnership on March 9, 2022, in response to the Russian invasion of Ukraine.

References

External links
 Discovery Channel from MBG

Russia
Defunct television channels in Russia
Television channels and stations established in 2006
2006 establishments in Russia
Warner Bros. Discovery EMEA